Heliaster microbrachius is a species of Asteroidea (sea stars) in the family Heliasteridae.

Description
The body consists of a disc with several rays. At the bottom of the body there is a mouth opening. These sea stars have a very large disc, somewhat elevated, with more or less flattened rays. Abactinal spines are very numerous, small, more or less cylindrical. Color of abactinal surface may be purplish or grayish-black, with deep yellow or whitish spines. The actinal surface is whitish, yellowish, or brownish, with pedicels much darker than spines. These sea stars can regenerate lost or damaged parts of their body. These multi-armed marine organisms are known for their autonomy, which refers to the process of losing limbs in response to harmful conditions, and their ability to regenerate such limbs. However, as a consequence of this autonomy and regeneration of body parts, the marine animals’ feeding rates decrease. Because their energy used for catching prey is allocated into their regeneration of arms, autonomy reduces the growth and reproduction of the Heliaster species.

Distribution
This species is present in the east Pacific, along the west coast of South and Central America and Mexico.

References

 Mah, C. (2010). Heliaster microbrachius Xantus, 1860. In: Mah, C.L. (2010). World Asteroidea database

External links
 Echinoblog
 The echinoderms of Panama

 
Animals described in 1860
Taxa named by John Xantus